The president of the Senate of Romania is the senator elected to preside over the Senate meetings. The president of the Senate is also the president of the Standing Bureau of the Senate, and the first person in the presidential line of succession.

Election

The president of the Senate is elected by secret ballot with the majority of votes from the senators. If none of the candidates obtains the necessary votes, the first two compete again, and the one with most of the votes wins.

Role

 Calls the Senate in session (ordinary or extraordinary);
 Presides the Senate meetings, assisted by two secretaries;
 Represents the Senate in the relation with the President, the Chamber of Deputies, the Government, Constitutional Court
 Represents the Senate in the foreign relations;
 Succeeds (ad interim) the president if the latter resigns, is suspended, incapacitated or dies in office. (They continue to be president of the Senate during the ad-interim presidency of the country. They act as president until a new president is elected.)

History

1864–1866
Between 3 July 1864 and 1 June 1866 the Upper House of the Legislative was called Corpul Ponderator. Members were nominated by the domnitor, based on the proposals of the counties.

1866–1946
The upper house was called Senat or Camera Senatului. Most of the Senators were elected, some were senators by right (senatori de drept), as established by the 1866 Constitution. Voters and members had to be at least 40 years of age, except the heir to the throne, that was senator at 18 years, and allowed to vote in the Senate at 21.

1946–1989
In 1946 elections were called only for the Assembly of Deputies (Adunarea Deputaţilor), as the 1923 Constitution was re-empowered with some modifications. After the overthrow of the king and the establishment of the communist republic, the upper house was dissolved and disbanded.

1990–present
The upper house is called Senat and is headed by a president.

List of officeholders 

Ad interim (acting) officeholders are denoted by italics. The Rule of the Senate states that at the first standing of the house, the meeting is headed by the eldest senator and helped by the youngest senator. Those bear the title of Interim President of the Senate, and, as their term is very short (one or two days), they are not listed. The interim officeholders listed have hold the office in different circumstances and for a longer time (i.e. than one or two days). 

They were actually Vice Presidents standing as caretaker President during a vacancy. The caretaker Vice Presidents during the two impeachments of Traian Băsescu in April–May 2007 (Doru Ioan Tărăcilă [ro]) and in June–July 2012 (Petru Filip) are also listed in the table below.

The political stance of presidents of the upper house prior to the development of a modern party system is given by the following key/legend:

The political stance of presidents of the upper house after the development of a modern party system is given by the following key/legend:

Notes

References 

Romania, Senate